Chimerica is a 2013 play by the British dramatist Lucy Kirkwood. It draws its title from the term Chimerica, referring to the predominance of China and America in modern geopolitics. The play premiered in London at the Almeida Theatre and was directed by Lyndsey Turner. Turner's production received several awards and was well-reviewed. A Channel 4 four-part drama of the same name based on the play was released in 2019.

Development 
Playwright Lucy Kirkwood was commissioned to write the play that would become Chimerica in 2006, seven years before it eventually premiered. Kirkwood estimated that she spent about 100,000 hours working on the play, some of which time was spent shortening its initially four-and-a-half hour run time.

The title of the play comes from the portmanteau Chimerica, coined by Niall Ferguson and Moritz Schularick, referring to the significance of the sociopolitical relationship between China and America, especially in the global economy. Kirkwood has also cited the similarity in sound between 'Chimerica' and the word 'chimera' as a reason for the title.

Synopsis 
Chimerica follows photojournalist Joe Schofield, who photographed the unidentified Tank Man during the 1989 Tiananmen Square protests and massacre. Twenty years later, Chinese dissident and ESL teacher Zhang Lin, who was present during the 1989 pro-democracy protests and subsequent massacre, assists Joe in his quest to find Tank Man. Zhang Lin's fiancee, Liuli, died in the protests and flashback scenes between Liuli and Zhang Lin appear throughout the play. Joe's journalist colleagues recommend that Joe not pursue the Tank Man. After Joe returns to America, where Lin suggests the Tank Man is living, Zhang Lin is tortured by the Chinese authorities. Joe develops a relationship with Englishwoman, Tessa, who is profiling the Chinese population so that her employer can have an advantage in China. At the end of the play, it is revealed that Zhang Lin was the Tank Man.

Characters 
 Joe Schofield, an American photojournalist
 Frank Hadley, Joe's editor
Mel Stanwick, a journalist
Tessa Kendrick, a market analyst
Zhang Lin, an ESL teacher and Joe's primary contact in China
Liuli, Zhang Lin's former fiancée, killed during Tiananmen Square protests
Benny, Zhang Lin's nephew
Zhang Wei, Zhang Lin's brother, Benny's assistant
Paul Kramer, in 1989 was the Beijing correspondent for The Herald 
Feng Meihui, a Chinese businesswoman living in New York
Jennifer Lee, Feng Meihui's daughter
Maria Dubiecki, a senator
David Barker, Maria's assistant
Mary Chang, a Chinese woman living in New York
Ming Xiaoli, Zhang Lin's neighbour
Doreen, Frank's assistant
Michelle, an Asian-American police officer
Officer Hyte, Michelle's partner
Herb, an American tourist, married to Barb
Barb, an American tourist, married to Herb
Kate, a British reporter at Tiananmen Square
Deng, a young Chinese businesswoman
Peter Rourke, an American CEO of a company with an office in Beijing
Dawn, Peter's secretary
Judy, a lawyer for Peter's company
Pengsi, a Chinese man living in New York
Pengsi's Wife
Guard
Nurse
Woman in Strip Club
Drug Dealer

Production history

Premiere 
Chimerica premiered at the Almeida Theatre, London from 20 May 2013 to 6 July 2013, in a production co-produced with Headlong before transferring to the Harold Pinter Theatre. The production was directed by Lyndsey Turner with stage design by Es Devlin.

Premiere cast

Subsequent productions 
In September 2015, Chimerica was performed for the first time in the United States. The production was directed by David Muse at Studio Theatre in Washington, D.C.. Rob Yang played Zhang Lin opposite Ron Menzel's Joe Schofield.

Chimerica made its Canadian premiere at the Royal Manitoba Theatre Centre in 2016. The production was directed by Chris Abraham and starred Evan Buliung as Joe and Paul Sun-Hyung Lee as Zhang Lin. Filmmaker Deco Dawson provided video which was projected during the performance. This production was co-produced by the Royal Manitoba Theatre Centre and by Toronto's Canadian Stage. After playing in Winnipeg from February till mid-March, the production travelled to Toronto and played from the end of March to mid-April.

Later in 2016, Chimerica played in Chicago at TimeLine Theatre under the direction of Nick Bowling.

Chimerica premiered in Australia in March 2017. Kip Williams directed the Sydney Theatre Company production at the Roslyn Packer Theatre. The production starred Mark Leonard Winter as Joe and Jason Chong as Zhang Lin among the cast of 32 actors.

In February and March 2022, the Crane Creations Theatre Company led a play reading of Chimerica on its Play Date. This play reading is meant to spread awareness and increase appreciation of playwrights and playwriting from around the world and to global audiences.

Adaptations 
In 2019, Channel 4 released a four-part drama called Chimerica inspired by the play. The adaptation was penned by Lucy Kirkwood who made several changes from the original script including changing the setting from 2012 to 2016. The main character in the series is called Lee Berger and is played by Alessandro Nivola.

Reception
The play as a whole has been criticized for its ambitious runtime of over three hours.

The Almeida production was described in one review as "fluent and seductive", with a "filmic quality", with the multiple set changes well-handled. The premiere was well received and garnered many awards.

In September 2019, The Guardian writers listed it as the 10th best theatre show since 2000.

Awards

See also

References

2013 plays
Plays by Lucy Kirkwood
1989 Tiananmen Square protests and massacre
Plays set in China
Plays set in New York City
Beijing in fiction